Athletes from the Federal People's Republic of Yugoslavia competed at the 1956 Summer Olympics in Melbourne, Australia. 35 competitors, 32 men and 3 women, took part in 16 events in 8 sports.

Medalists

Athletics

Men's 110m Hurdles 
Stanko Lorger
 Heat — 14.6s
 Semifinals — 14.6s
 Final — 14.5s (→ 5th place)

Men's Marathon 
Franjo Mihalić — 2:26:32 (→  Silver Medal)

Cycling

Individual road race
Veselin Petrović — 5:26:58 (→ 26th place)

Football

Men's Team Competition
 First Round: 
 Yugoslavia free
 Quarterfinals: 
 Yugoslavia – United States 9:1 (5:1) 
 Semifinals: 
 Yugoslavia – India 4:1 (0:0)
 Final: 
 Yugoslavia – USSR 0:1 (0:0)

 Team Roster:
 Petar Radenković
 Mladen Koščak
 Nikola Radović
 Ivan Šantek
 Ljubiša Spajić
 Dobroslav Krstić
 Dragoslav Šekularac
 Zlatko Papec
 Sava Antić
 Todor Veselinović
 Muhamed Mujić
 Blagoje Vidinić
 Ibrahim Biogradlić
 Luka Lipošinović
 Joško Vidošević
 Vladica Popović
 Kruno Radiljević

Rowing

Yugoslavia had one male rowers participate in one out of seven rowing events in 1956.

 Men's single sculls
 Perica Vlašić

Shooting

One shooter represented Yugoslavia in 1956.

50 m rifle, three positions
 Zlatko Mašek

50 m rifle, prone
 Zlatko Mašek

Swimming

Water polo

Wrestling

References

External links
Official Olympic Reports
International Olympic Committee results database

Nations at the 1956 Summer Olympics
1956
Summer Olympics